Megha Akash (born 26 October 1995) is an Indian actress who predominantly appears in Tamil and Telugu films. She made her acting debut with the Telugu film Lie (2017). She made her Tamil film debut with Petta and Hindi film debut with Satellite Shankar, both in 2019. She has also appeared in Raja Raja Chora (2021), a commercial success and Dear Megha (2021).

Early life 
Megha was born on 26 October 1995, in Madras (now Chennai), Tamil Nadu to a Telugu father and Malayali mother. Both her parents work in the advertising field. She attended the Lady Andal School in Chennai and graduated in B. Sc. (Visual Communications) from Women's Christian College, Chennai.

Career 
Megha started her career by performing in the film Oru Pakka Kathai, which released on ZEE5 on 25 December 2020. She later starred in the 2017 Telugu film Lie, which marked her debut. Her Tamil film debut was Petta (2019) though she shot for Enai Noki Paayum Thota (2019) before.

In 2021, Megha appeared in four films. The first release was the Tamil film Kutty Story where she played Preethi in the Segment: Avanum Naanum. She next appeared in her second bollywood film Radhe as Nikisha, a police officer. She next appeared in two Telugu films Raja Raja Chora as Sanjana, and Dear Megha as Megha.

Filmography

Films

Music videos

Discography

Awards and nominations

References

External links 

1995 births
Actresses from Chennai
Actresses in Tamil cinema
Actresses in Telugu cinema
Indian film actresses
Living people
Telugu actresses
Malayali people
21st-century Indian actresses
Actresses in Hindi cinema